Cynthia McQuillin (July 25, 1953 – January 14, 2006) was a filk singer and writer as well as an author and artist. She lived in the San Francisco Bay area. Her songs touched the usual filk topics of science fiction, fantasy, and cats, but also feminism, love, Paganism, and Sizeism.

Her life partner and frequent musical collaborator was the filk singer James Robinson, who was then known as Dr. Jane Robinson.  McQuillin reportedly said, upon meeting James for the first time, "At last I get to meet the man I fell in love with!"

Cynthia was inducted to the Filk Hall of Fame at FilKONtario in 1998.

A book of songs by McQuillin as the "Cynthia McQuillin Songbook, ("everything that Dr. Jim Robinson, Kristoph Klover & Margaret Davis, Harold Stein, Mary Creasey, Kay Shapero, Bob Kanefsky, Alan Thiesen, and Lee Gold could find in 2013") was compiled and published by Lee Gold in 2013.

Discography
Crystal Singer - 1981
Crystal Vision (with Phillip Wayne) 
Singer in the Shadow - 1983
Minus Ten and Counting - 1983
Shadow Spun - 1986
Dark Moon Circle  - 1987
Moon Shadows - 1989, reissued by Shadowsinger Records
Dreams of Fortune - 1991, reissued by Shadowsinger Records
Midlife Crisis - performed by Midlife Crisis: Cynthia McQuillin and Dr. Jane Robinson
Bedlam Cats - 1992 - performed by Midlife Crisis, plus Margaret Davis, Kristoph Klover, Patrick McKenna, and Sharon Williams
Uncharted Stars - 1993
This Heavy Heart - 1994
Witch's Dance - 1998

Bibliography
A partial list of McQuillin's published short stories. This list includes only professional publications, not the many that were published in fanzines.
 Cat's World - CATFANTASTIC 3, DAW Books 1994
 The Chieri's Godchild - SNOWS OF DARKOVER, DAW 1994 
 Daelith's Bargain - Sword and Sorceress 13, DAW 1996 
 Deep as Rivers - SWORD AND SORCERESS 17, DAW, 2000
 The Exterminator - Marion Zimmer Bradley's Fantasy Magazine #37, Autumn 1997
 The Forest - THE KEEPER'S PRICE, DAW 1980 
 Humphrey's Dilemma - MZB's Fantasy Magazine #29, Autumn 1995
 Leaves of Iron - SWORD AND SORCERESS 20, DAW, 200
 The Mages of Carthia - MZB's Fantasy Magazine, issue 21, Fall 1993
 The Mage Who Dreamed of Gryphons - MZB's Fantasy Magazine, issue 26, Summer 1995
 MZBeans (a soup) & Spiderfish Stew - Serve It Forth:  Cooking with Anne McCaffrey 
 Parri's Blade - SWORD AND SORCERESS 21, DAW, 2004
 Seliki - SUCH A PRETTY FACE, Meisha Merlin, 2000 
 Shadow Harper - SWORD AND SORCERESS 12, DAW 1995
 Space Station Annie - SPACE OPERA, DAW Dec 1996
 The Stone-weaver's Tale - SWORD AND SORCERESS 14, DAW Mar 1997
 Toyen - MARION ZIMMER BRADLEY'S FANTASY WORLDS, Sep 1998
 Virgin Spring - SWORD AND SORCERESS 11, DAW 1994
 Waking the Stone Maiden - SWORD AND SORCERESS 16, DAW, 1999
 Whistle the Wind - MZB's Fantasy Magazine #38, Winter 1998

Honors

Pegasus Awards
 1999 Best Writer/Composer
 2006 Best Writer/Composer (awarded posthumously)

Pegasus Nominations
 1987 Best Filk Song, "Crimson and Crystal"
 1988 Best Writer/Composer 
 1989 Best Writer/Composer 
 1991 Best War/Vengeance Song, "The Tyrant's Tale"
 1992 Best Writer/Composer 
 1993 Best Filk Song, "I Would Walk With You" 
 1993 Best Writer/Composer 
 1996 Best Filk Song, "Black Davie's Ride" 
 1997 Best Writer/Composer 
 1997 Best Sorcery Song, "Crimson and Crystal"
 1999 (w/ Jordin Kare) Best Fool Song, "Fool to Feed the Drive" 
 2004 Best Classic Filk Song, "Black Davie's Ride"
 2006 Best Writer/Composer
 2007 Best Classic Filk Song, "Black Davie's Ride"
 2008 Best Tragedy Song, "Black Davie's Ride"

Convention Honors
 Baycon, 1991:  Special Guest of Honor (Filk)
 OVFF, 1991:  Guest of Honor
 Fourplay, January 31-February 2, 1992: Guest
 Conterpoint Too!, June 21–23, 1996: invited but unable to attend
 ConFurence 10, April 1–4, 1999:  Guest of Honor (along with Mary Hanson-Roberts, artist)
 FilKONtario, 2003:  Guest of Honor (along with Dr. Jane Robinson)
 Fourplay (UK national filk convention #4), 1992 Guest of Honor (along with Dr. Jane Robinson)
 Marcon 39, 2004:  Filk Guest of Honor (along with Dr. Jane Robinson)

References 

Filkers
1953 births
2006 deaths
20th-century American singers
20th-century American writers
20th-century American women writers
20th-century American women singers
American women singer-songwriters
American singer-songwriters
21st-century American women